Mount Cambria (also Sheep Hill or Taka-a-raro / Takararo) is one of the volcanoes in the Auckland volcanic field. Located in the suburb of Devonport north-east of Mt Victoria, its 30-metre scoria cone was quarried away. The site is now Cambria Reserve.

History

The hill was traditionally known as Takararo ("The Hill Standing Below"), contrasting with the larger Takarunga / Mount Victoria ("The Hill Standing Above"). It was named Heaphy Hill after Charles Heaphy by Ferdinand von Hochstetter in 1859, but this name is not used.

The hill was quarried between the 1870s and 1977, initially by private contractors and later by the Devonport Borough Council.

Notes

References
 City of Volcanoes: A geology of Auckland - Searle, Ernest J.; revised by Mayhill, R.D.; Longman Paul, 1981. First published 1964. .
 Volcanoes of Auckland: The Essential guide - Hayward, B.W., Murdoch, G., Maitland, G.; Auckland University Press, 2011.
Volcanoes of Auckland: A Field Guide. Hayward, B.W.; Auckland University Press, 2019, 335 pp. .

External links
 View from Mt Cambria in 1927, towards Mt Victoria.
 Photographs of Mount Cambria held in Auckland Libraries' heritage collections.

Auckland volcanic field
Cam